Permanent cells are cells that are incapable of regeneration. These cells are considered to be terminally differentiated and non-proliferative in postnatal life. This includes neurons, heart cells, skeletal muscle cells and red blood cells. Although these cells are considered permanent in that they neither reproduce nor transform into other cells, this does not mean that the body cannot create new versions of these cells. For instance, structures in the bone marrow produce new red blood cells constantly, while skeletal muscle damage can be repaired by underlying satellite cells, which fuse to become a new skeletal muscle cell.

Disease and virology studies can use permanent cells to maintain cell count and accurately quantify the effects of vaccines. Some embryology studies also use permanent cells to avoid harvesting embryonic cells from pregnant animals; since the cells are permanent, they may be harvested at a later age when an animal is fully developed.

See also
 Labile cells, which multiply constantly throughout life
 Stable cells, which only multiply when receiving external stimulus to do so

References

Anatomical terminology
Cells